Robert King Stone (December 11, 1822 – April 23, 1872) was an American physician and professor at Columbian College Medical School (predecessor to today's George Washington University School of Medicine). He was considered "the dean of the Washington medical community". 

Stone served U.S. President Abraham Lincoln during the years of the American Civil War, frequently treating maladies from the Lincoln family. Stone was present at Lincoln's deathbed and at his autopsy in 1865. Stone was one of 14 doctors to attend President Lincoln at his death bed. Stone was the only witness to his condition at the military tribunal, and his testimony has been shared by the National Archive of the United States.

Personal life and education 
The son of engraver William J. Stone and his wife Elizabeth Jane Lenthall, Robert King Stone was born in Washington, D.C. Lenthall was the daughter of John Lenthall one of the architects of the United States Capitol.

He received his medical degree from the University of Pennsylvania in 1845 and visited major hospitals of London, Paris and Vienna before starting his own medical practice in the United States in 1847. Stone specialized in eye problems and was professor of Ophthalmic and Aural Surgery.

At the time of his death, from apoplexy, he was one of the most prominent physicians in Washington, D.C. He was survived by his wife, Elizabeth J. Stone, who died in 1892.

Legacy 

A collection of his papers is held at the National Library of Medicine in Bethesda, Maryland. Stone's "lost" report of the Lincoln autopsy was discovered in 1965 and examined by John K. Lattimer. Some of his notes of the autopsy were displayed at the Fenimore Art Museum in Cooperstown, New York.

References

Further reading 

1822 births
1872 deaths
19th-century American physicians
People of the American Civil War
People associated with the assassination of Abraham Lincoln
George Washington University faculty
George Washington University deans
Physicians from Washington, D.C.